Dompo may refer to:

Dompo language, Ghana
Kwesi Dompo
Dompo, a former or alternative name of Dompu, Indonesia